The New Mexico Corrections Department (NMCD) is a state agency of New Mexico, headquartered in unincorporated Santa Fe County, near Santa Fe. It the department operates corrections facilities, probate and parole programs, a prisoner reentry services, and an offender database.

Facilities and security levels

This list includes detention facilities in New Mexico which house state prisoners. There are no federal prisons in New Mexico and the list does not include county jails located in the state.

1980 riot
See more: New Mexico State Penitentiary riot

The Penitentiary of New Mexico Prison Riot, which took place on the weekend of February 2 and 3, 1980, was the most violent prison riot to date in the history of the American prison system. During an inmate takeover lasting only 36 hours, 33 inmates were killed and 12 officers were held hostage by prisoners who had escaped from a dormitory in the main unit, the southern half of the prison. Inmates were brutally butchered, dismembered, burned alive with torches and hung up in the cell house for display. Although taking many years, this riot eventually led to several changes in New Mexico's prison system, including a modern inmate classification system modeled after the U.S. Federal Bureau of Prisons, as well as the closing of the prison cellhouses and dormitories that were in use at the time of the riot.

See also
 List of law enforcement agencies in New Mexico
 List of United States state correction agencies
 List of U.S. state prisons
 Prison
 New Mexico State Penitentiary riot

Notes

References

External links
New Mexico Corrections Department

State law enforcement agencies of New Mexico
State corrections departments of the United States
 
New Mexico